Laotian Festivals are usually based on Theravada Buddhism.

Notable festivals and public holidays

Boun Bang Fay (ງານບຸນບັ້ງໄຟ)
Boun Fai Payanak
Boun Haw Khao Padap Din (ງານບຸນຫໍ່ເຂົ້າປະດັບດິນ)
Boun Khao Pansa(ງານບຸນເຂົ້າພັນສາ)
Boun Khun Khao
Boun Makha Busaa
Boun Ok Pansa
Boun Suang Huea
Boun That Luang
Boun That Sikhot
Boun Wat Phu Champasak
Chinese New Year/Tết
Hmong New Year
International Labor Day
Lai Heua Fai
Lao Children's Day
Lao Elephant Festival
Lao Independence Day
Lao Issara Day
Lao New Day
Lao Women's Day
Pi Mai Lao
Ok Phansa
Pathet Lao Day
That In Hang Festival
Vixakha Bouxa

See also 
 Public holidays in Laos

References

External links
Laos Cultural Profile (Ministry of Information and Culture/Visiting Arts)

Laotian culture
Festivals
 Laos
Laos
Laos